Bravo is a New Zealand television channel owned and operated by Warner Bros. Discovery and NBCUniversal International Networks, broadcast via the state-owned Kordia transmission network, Sky and on the website ThreeNow. The channel launched on 3 July 2016. Much like its American cable network counterpart, Bravo focuses on design, food, glamour and pop culture.

History
Bravo launched on 3 July 2016. Following the closure of Four, a one and a half minute promotion aired, previewing the content to be expected on Bravo. The first show to be broadcast on Bravo was Top Chef, at 5:10am.

On 1 May 2017, Bravo adopted a new black logo to match its U.S counterpart, which had rebranded to that same logo three months earlier.

In early September 2020, MediaWorks confirmed that it would be selling its television media assets, which include Bravo, to the US mass media multinational company Discovery, Inc.

On 1 December 2020, Discovery, Inc completed the acquisition of MediaWorks TV Limited. This acquisition also includes sister channels The Edge TV, The Breeze TV and Three, as well as news service Newshub.

Bravo Plus 1

On 3 July 2016, coinciding with the launch of Bravo, MediaWorks launched a standard hour delayed timeshift channel of the broadcast to replace Four Plus 1.

References

External links

Television channels in New Zealand
Television channels and stations established in 2016
English-language television stations in New Zealand
Warner Bros. Discovery Asia-Pacific
Warner Bros. Discovery networks
2016 establishments in New Zealand